Krzysztof Chmielewski (born 8 June 2004) is a Polish competitive swimmer specializing in butterfly and freestyle events. He competed in the 2020 Summer Olympics.

He is the twin brother of Michał Chmielewski; both competed in the 200m butterfly event of the 2021 European Junior Swimming Championships with Krzysztof winning gold and Michał winning silver.

References

External links

2004 births
Living people
Swimmers at the 2020 Summer Olympics
Polish male butterfly swimmers
Olympic swimmers of Poland
21st-century Polish people